BPM "Dance Unlimited" (stylized as BPM "DANCE∞") is the second remix album by J-pop duo Two-Mix, released by King Records on March 26, 1997. It features remixes of six of the duo's hit singles. The album is the duo's only release offered in 12" LP format.

The album peaked at No. 11 on Oricon's weekly albums chart.

Track listing

Charts

References

External links 
 
 

1997 remix albums
Two-Mix albums
Japanese-language compilation albums
King Records (Japan) compilation albums